Olav Rune Ekeland Bastrup (born 4 September 1956, in Volda) is a Norwegian writer and historian. He has published numerous books on social history subjects such as the use of eugenics in Scandinavia and the Norwegian roma-minority.
He spoke at the Solidaritetskongressen, Gjøvik, August 2005.

Works
 Olav Rune Ekeland Bastrup, Aage Georg Sivertsen, En landevei mot undergangen. Utryddelsen av taterkulturen Norge, Universitetsforlaget, 1996,  ("The road to destruction. Eradication of gypsy culture of Norway")
 El Jucan: asfaltens sønn : historien om fakirens liv, Aschehoug, 1993, 
 Olav Rune Ekeland Bastrup, Ulrik Sissener Kirkedam, Hisøy menighetsråd, Jubileumsskrift for Hisøy kirke gjennom 150 år, Hisøy historielag, 1999,

References

External links
Author's website

1956 births
Living people
Norwegian male writers
20th-century Norwegian historians
People from Volda
21st-century Norwegian historians